6X or 6-X may refer to:

6X, a brand of beer by Wadworth Brewery
6x, or six times in multiplication
Saab 9-6X
SZD-6X Nietoperz
Piper 6X; see Piper PA-32
Alberta Highway 6X; see List of Alberta provincial highways
A/MH-6X, a model of Boeing AH-6
 Six Men Getting Sick (Six Times), film
6X, the production code for the 1985 Doctor Who serial The Mark of the Rani

See also
X6 (disambiguation)
 6S (disambiguation)